José Augusto Soares Ribeiro de Castro (Valhelhas, 7 April 1868 – 31 July 1929; , was a Portuguese lawyer, journalist and politician. He graduated in law at the University of Coimbra, and was a lawyer in Lisbon and Guarda. A member of freemasonry, he was originally a monarchist and a member of the liberal Progressive Party, but he joined the Portuguese Republican Party, in 1881. He was the main redactor of the newspaper O Districto da Guarda, since its foundation in 1878, and the founder of the first republican newspaper of the province, O Povo Português, in 1882. During the Portuguese First Republic, he remained in the Republican Party. He was President of the Ministry (Prime Minister), after the failed attempt of general Joaquim Pimenta de Castro to rule without the parliament, and was in office, from 17 May to 29 November 1915.

References

1868 births
1929 deaths
Naval ministers of Portugal
People from Guarda, Portugal
Progressive Party (Portugal) politicians
Portuguese Republican Party politicians
Prime Ministers of Portugal
Government ministers of Portugal
Portuguese journalists
Male journalists
Portuguese Freemasons
University of Coimbra alumni
19th-century Portuguese writers
19th-century male writers
19th-century Portuguese lawyers